A Temperamental Wife is a 1919 silent film adventure drama directed by David Kirkland and starring Constance Talmadge, Wyndham Standing and Ben Hendricks Sr.  Based on a stage play entitled Information, Please, written by Jane Cowl and Jane Murfin.

Plot
A young bride is jealous of her husband's female secretary.

Cast
 Constance Talmadge as Billie Billings
 Wyndham Standing as Senator Newton
 Ben Hendricks Sr. as Dr. Wise
 Eulalie Jensen as Smith
 Armand Kaliz as Count Tosoff de Zoolac
 Ned Sparks as The Hotel Clerk

References

External links
 

1919 films
American silent feature films
American black-and-white films
American adventure drama films
1910s adventure drama films
Films based on works by Jane Cowl
Films based on works by Jane Murfin
American films based on plays
1919 drama films
1910s American films
Silent American drama films
Silent adventure drama films